KTPI may refer to:

 Party for National Unity and Solidarity (Kerukanan Tulodo Pranatan Ingit, KTPI), Suriname
 KTPI-FM, a radio station (97.7 FM) licensed to Mojave, California, US
 KTPI (AM), a radio station (1340 AM) licensed to Mojave, California, US

See also
 KPTI (disambiguation)